Club Atlético River Ebro is a Spanish football team based in Rincón de Soto, in the autonomous community of La Rioja. Founded in 1952 it plays in 3ª – Group 16, holding home games at Estadio San Miguel, with a capacity of 3,000 spectators.

History 
In May 1952, a group of fans met and agreed to found the official football club.

Season to season

28 seasons in Tercera División

Former players
 Óscar Arpón
 Fernando Llorente (youth)

References

External links
Unofficial website 
Futbolme team profile 

Football clubs in La Rioja (Spain)
Association football clubs established in 1952
1952 establishments in Spain